The 2011 FEI Nations Cup was the 2011 edition of the FEI Nations Cup, a premier international team Grand Prix show jumping competition run by the FEI. It was held at eight European venues from May 13 to August 26, 2011.

2011 show schedule

Standings 
At the end of the season, the two teams with the lowest points were relegated to the 2012 FEI Nations Cup Promotional League.
After the CSIO Dublin it was sure that the team of Denmark will be relegated. At the CSIO Rotterdam the teams of France, Belgium and the United States had fight against the relegation. At the end the United States was relegated.

Final standings

External links 
 
 FEI YouTube channel: News from the last event of the FEI Nations Cup 2011
 Brits finish second in Rotterdam Nations Cup, equestrianteamgbr.co.uk
 results of the 2011 FEI Nations Cup events (without the CHIO Aachen)